Demarcus Dontavian Robinson (September 21, 1994) is an American football wide receiver who is a free agent. He played college football at Florida.

Early years
Robinson attended and played high school football at Peach County High School.

College career
Robinson played his collegiate career at Florida from 2013–2015. He played minimally as a freshman in 2013 and finished the season with five receptions for 23 yards in seven games. Robinson was suspended twice during his freshman season after failing multiple tests for marijuana. In 2014, he had his breakout season and started 11 of 12 games. He was suspended for their season-opener, that was eventually canceled due to weather, against Idaho after failing another drug test for marijuana. Robinson made 53 receptions for 810 receiving yards and seven touchdown receptions. He led the Gators as a junior in 2015 with 48 receptions and also had 522 receiving yards and two touchdowns in 13 games and nine starts. On November 28, 2015, head coach Jim McElwain suspended Robinson 75 minutes before their 27–2 loss to Florida State. The suspension was due to a violation of NCAA and team rules. It was reported the violation was due to Robinson's meeting with a marketing official and it marked his fourth suspension in three years with Florida.

On December 21, 2015, McElwain announced that Robinson and teammate Kelvin Taylor would forgo their senior season and enter the 2016 NFL Draft. When asked about the early departures, McElwain commented, "I really don't get it." Both players were not regarded as first or second round picks and most experts saw their early entries as gambles.

Collegiate statistics

Professional career
Robinson was one of 43 collegiate wide receivers to attend the NFL Scouting Combine in Indianapolis, Indiana. He performed all of the required combine drills and finished 26th among wide receivers in the 40-yard dash. On March 22, 2016, Robinson opted to attend Florida's pro day, along with Keanu Neal, Vernon Hargreaves, Jonathan Bullard, Jake McGee, Brian Poole, Kelvin Taylor, Alex McCalister, Antonio Morrison, and six other teammates. He chose to run all of the combine drills again and put up similar numbers from the combine. Scouts and team representatives from all 32 NFL teams attended, including Pittsburgh Steelers' General Manager Kevin Colbert, to scout Robinson as he performed positional drills. During the draft process, Robinson had private meetings and workouts with multiple teams, that Included the Philadelphia Eagles, Kansas City Chiefs, Oakland Raiders, and New York Jets. At the conclusion of the pre-draft process, Robinson was projected to be a fifth to seventh round draft pick by NFL draft experts and scouts.

Kansas City Chiefs
The Kansas City Chiefs selected Robinson in the fourth round (126th overall) of the 2016 NFL Draft. He was the 14th wide receiver selected in 2016.

2016
On May 6, 2016, the Kansas City Chiefs signed Robinson to a four-year, $2.85 million contract that includes a signing bonus of $517,172.

Throughout his first training camp, he competed against Seantavius Jones, Mike Williams, Da'Ron Brown, Tyreek Hill, Mitch Mathews, and Kashif Moore for a backup wide receiver role. Head coach Andy Reid named him the fourth wide receiver on the depth chart to start the season, behind Jeremy Maclin, Albert Wilson, and Chris Conley.

He made his professional regular season debut in the Kansas City Chiefs' season-opening 33–27 victory over the San Diego Chargers. Robinson played in 16 games in 2016, but mainly appeared on special teams and finished without a statistic. After finishing 12–4, the Kansas City Chiefs received a playoff berth after finishing atop the AFC West. On January 15, 2017, Robinson appeared in his first career postseason game as the Chiefs lost 16–18 to the Pittsburgh Steelers in the AFC Divisional Round.

2017
The Chiefs opted to release wide receiver Jeremy Maclin during training camp and held an open competition for his vacant starting wide receiver role. Robinson competed against Chris Conley, Tyreek Hill, De'Anthony Thomas, Albert Wilson, and Kenny Cook. He was named the fifth wide receiver on the depth chart behind Conley, Hill, Wilson, and Thomas.

On September 24, 2017, Robinson caught two passes for nine yards during a 24–10 victory at the Los Angeles Chargers. He made his first career reception on a two-yard pass by quarterback Alex Smith before being tackled by cornerback Desmond King in the third quarter. On October 15, 2017, he earned his first career start after Albert Wilson suffered a knee injury and Chris Conley was placed on injured/reserve with a ruptured achilles. He made one reception for 16 yards in their 13–19 loss to the Pittsburgh Steelers. The following week, he made his second consecutive start and caught a season-high five passes for 69 yards in the Chiefs’ 31–30 loss at the Oakland Raiders. On December 31, 2017, Robinson made his eighth start of the season, replacing Tyreek Hill who was inactive after suffering a death in his family. Robinson went on to make four receptions for 31 yards in a 27–24 win at the Denver Broncos. He finished the  season with 21 receptions for 212 receiving yards in 16 games and eight starts. The Kansas City Chiefs finished first in the AFC West with a 10–6 record. On January 6, 2018, Robinson made his first career postseason start and caught four passes for 57 yards and a touchdown during the Chiefs' 22–21 AFC Wild Card Round loss to the Tennessee Titans. He scored the first touchdown of his career on a 14-yard pass by Alex Smith in the second quarter.

2018
In the 2018 season, Robinson appeared in all 16 regular season games, of which he started five. He recorded 22 receptions for 288 receiving yards and four receiving touchdowns. He scored a receiving touchdown in the last three games. In Week 17, he caught an 89-yard touchdown against the Raiders, which was Patrick Mahomes's 50th touchdown pass of the season.

2019
In Week 2 against the Oakland Raiders, Robinson caught six passes for 172 yards and two touchdowns as the Chiefs won 28–10. Overall, Robinson finished the 2019 season with 32 receptions for 449 receiving yards and four receiving touchdowns. Robinson won his first championship when the Chiefs defeated the San Francisco 49ers 31–20 in Super Bowl LIV. He contributed on offense and special teams in the game but did not record a target or catch.

2020
On April 8, 2020, Robinson re-signed with the Chiefs on a one-year contract. Overall, he finished the 2020 season with 45 receptions for 466 receiving yards and three receiving touchdowns. He was placed on the reserve/COVID-19 list by the team on February 1, 2021, and activated on February 5. He played in Super Bowl LV, recording a single 11-yard reception in the 31–9 loss to the Tampa Bay Buccaneers.

2021
On March 25, 2021, Chiefs re-signed Robinson to a one-year contract. In the 2021 season, Robinson appeared in all 17 games and had 25 receptions for 264 yards and three touchdowns.

Las Vegas Raiders
On March 22, 2022, Robinson signed with the Las Vegas Raiders. He was released on August 16, 2022.

Baltimore Ravens
Robinson signed with the Baltimore Ravens on August 23, 2022. He scored his first touchdown as a Raven on 12 yard reception in a 38–42 Week 2 loss against the Miami Dolphins. In Week 11, against the Carolina Panthers, he had a career-high nine receptions for 128 receiving yards in the 13–3 victory.

NFL career statistics

Personal life
Robinson's uncle is former NFL wide receiver Marcus Robinson who played for the Chicago Bears, Baltimore Ravens,
and Minnesota Vikings from –.

References

External links

Twitter
Baltimore Ravens bio
Florida Gators bio

1994 births
Living people
American football wide receivers
Baltimore Ravens players
Florida Gators football players
Kansas City Chiefs players
Las Vegas Raiders players
People from Fort Valley, Georgia
Players of American football from Georgia (U.S. state)